MPIR may refer to:

Max Planck Institute for Radio Astronomy, in Bonn, Germany
MPIR (mathematics software)

See also
 Mpiri
 Minnesota Public Interest Research Group